George Alexander Cruickshank (13 February 1897 – 17 November 1970) was a Liberal party member of the House of Commons of Canada. He was born in Minot, North Dakota, United States  and moved to Canada later in 1897. He became a farmer by career.

He was first elected to Parliament at the Fraser Valley riding in the 1940 general election then re-elected in 1945 and 1949. Cruickshank was defeated by Alexander Bell Patterson in the 1953 election.

Cruickshank served as reeve of Matsqui, British Columbia from 1931 to 1940. He died in Abbotsford, British Columbia in on 17 November 1970.

References

External links
 

1897 births
1970 deaths
American emigrants to Canada
Mayors of places in British Columbia
Canadian farmers
Liberal Party of Canada MPs
Members of the House of Commons of Canada from British Columbia
People from Minot, North Dakota